Heather Joan Harvey  (September 1899 – 1989), was a British writer and Liberal Party politician.

Background
Harvey was educated privately at Prior's Field School, Godalming, and Newnham College, Cambridge, where she graduated in 1921 with first-class honours, economics tripos. In 1973 she was appointed a CBE for political services in the Queen's Birthday Honours.

Professional career
Harvey joined the Royal Institute of International Affairs, Chatham House, in 1931. She became secretary of the Study Groups Department in 1935. She was a temporary Civil servant in the Foreign Office, 1939–45. She served with the United Nations 1945–46 as deputy administrative secretary. She was a writer and was engaged in historical research.

Political career
Harvey was Honorary Treasurer of the Women's Liberal Federation, a member of the Liberal Party Organisation Council and the executive committee. She was Joint Honorary Treasurer of the Liberal Party.

Electoral record

References

1899 births
1989 deaths
People educated at Prior's Field School
Alumni of Newnham College, Cambridge
Chatham House people
Commanders of the Order of the British Empire
Liberal Party (UK) parliamentary candidates